Neurotrichini is a tribe within the subfamily Talpinae of the mole family. It includes the living genus Neurotrichus with a single living species, the American shrew-mole (Neurotrichus gibbsii). While today restricted to the New World, fossils are known from Eurasia.

References

Literature cited
Hutterer, R. 2005. Order Soricomorpha. Pp. 220–311 in Wilson, D.E. and Reeder, D.M. (eds.). Mammal Species of the World: a taxonomic and geographic reference. 3rd ed. Baltimore: The Johns Hopkins University Press, 2 vols., 2142 pp. 

Talpidae
Mammal tribes